Chineta is a rural locality (a selo) and the administrative center of Chinetinsky Selsoviet, Krasnoshchyokovsky District, Altai Krai, Russia. The population was 524 as of 2013. There are 10 streets.

Geography 
Chineta is located 69 km southeast of Krasnoshchyokovo (the district's administrative centre) by road. Ust-Beloye is the nearest rural locality.

References 

Rural localities in Krasnoshchyokovsky District